Turville-Petre is a surname.  People with this surname include:
Francis Turville-Petre, an English archaeologist, famous for discovering the 'Galilee Skull', and a friend of Christopher Isherwood and W. H. Auden
E. O. G. Turville-Petre (commonly known as Gabriel Turville-Petre), an English Professor of Ancient Icelandic Literature and Antiquities at Oxford University
Joan Turville-Petre, a Lecturer in English, Anglo-Saxon and Ancient Icelandic at Oxford University

See also
Petre

Compound surnames
English-language surnames